Mount Davis is the highest point in Pennsylvania.  Located in the  Forbes State Forest near the hamlet of Markleton in Elk Lick Township, Somerset County; it lies on a gentle crest of a  ridge line extending from central Somerset County southward into Garrett County, Maryland known as Negro Mountain.

Description
The high point was named for John Nelson Davis, an early settler, American Civil War veteran, surveyor, and naturalist known for his studies of the mountain's flora and fauna. During the Civil War, Davis served in Company E, 102nd Pennsylvania Infantry.

The summit of Mt. Davis may be ascended by car or a number of hiking trails. Its surroundings are noted for their  patterns of unusual circular stone formed by periglacial action. A metal observation tower with a relief map of the region stands near the true high point. Mount Davis ranks 33rd on the list of highest natural points in each U.S. state.

History

In 1921, the USGS established that Mount Davis was the highest peak in Pennsylvania. Previously the highest peak was believed to be Bedford County's Blue Knob. On June 18, 1921, the local chamber of commerce held a ceremony to celebrate the newly named highest point in Pennsylvania. In addition to the observation tower, a cabin once stood at the top of Mount Davis.

On June 6, 2022, the website listsofjohn reported it had discovered another nearby point as the true state highpoint through the use of lidar.

Trails
Trails in the park include:

 High Point Trail: 
 Mt. Davis Trail: 
 Shelter Rock Trail: 
 Tub Mill Run Trail: 
 Timberslide Trail: 
 Laurel Run Trail: 
 Wolf Rock Trail: 
 Shelter Rock Road: 
 Livengood Trail:

Climate

Climate on the peak is warm in the summer, and cold in the winter. Like much of Pennsylvania, Mount Davis can experience heavy winds, rain, and hail in the summer, with ice storms and blizzards in the winter. Summer conditions are generally mild and winters are characterized by a lot of snowfall.

Mount Davis has a humid continental climate that is affected by the high elevation significantly enough that the area feels slightly more like a cooler version of the climate zone during the winter months. Due to its high elevation, the area is colder much of the winter than Altoona, Johnstown, or State College, despite being well south of those locations. During the summer months, the area is a retreat for other Pennsylvanians with high temperatures being cooler on average than Pittsburgh and eastern portions of the state. Mount Davis recorded many impressive record lows and is quite close to the state's all-time coldest temperature.

See also

 List of U.S. states by elevation

References

External links

Mountains of Pennsylvania
Allegheny Mountains
Landforms of Somerset County, Pennsylvania
Highest points of U.S. states
Laurel Highlands
Tourist attractions in Somerset County, Pennsylvania